Lawrence Edward Gaines (born December 15, 1953) is a former American football running back in the National Football League (NFL). He was drafted by the Detroit Lions 16th overall in the 1976 NFL Draft. He played college football at Wyoming.

References

1953 births
Living people
American football fullbacks
Wyoming Cowboys football players
Detroit Lions players